"Firefly" is a song by New Zealand band Drax Project, featuring American rapper Fetty Wap and New Zealand musician AACACIA. The song was a success in New Zealand, becoming platinum certified.

Background and composition

The song was written in Los Angeles with Rogét Chahayed and Imad Royal in a single three-hour writing session, and was inspired by a visit to Long Island.  The band added a brass section to the song, as they felt that this suited the song's party vibe.

Release

The song was released as a single on 23 October 2020. A music video was released for the song, which was shot in a rural area of Wellington.

Credits and personnel

Credits adapted from Tidal.

AACACIA – featured artist
Matt Beachen – drums, songwriter
Dale Becker – mastering engineer
Rogét Chahayed – producer, songwriter
Drax Project – performer, engineer
Imad-Roy El-Amine – producer, songwriter
Jack Harre – trumpet
Ben O'Leary – guitar, songwriter
Tyler K. Scott – mixing
Shaan Singh – songwriter, tenor saxophone
Tyler Shields – engineer
Sam Thomson – bass, songwriter
Kaito Walley – trombone
Fetty Wap – featured artist, songwriter

Charts

Weekly charts

Year-end charts

Certifications

References

2020 singles
2020 songs
Drax Project songs
Fetty Wap songs
Songs written by Fetty Wap
Songs written by Rogét Chahayed